George Harold "Hal" Bennett (April 21, 1930 – September 11, 2004) was an author known for a variety of books. His 1970 novel Lord of Dark Places was described as "a satirical and all but scatological attack on the phallic myth", and was reprinted in 1997. He was Playboys most promising writer of the year.  He also wrote under the pen names Harriet Janeway and John D. Revere (the Assassin series). His books are sometimes compared to Mark Twain's style of satire, but contain a much stronger sexual tone.

Awards and honors
1973: William Faulkner Prize

Selected bibliography

 The Mexico City Poems and House on Hay (Chicago: Obsidian Press, 1961)
 A Wilderness of Vines (Garden City: Doubleday, 1966)
 The Black Wine (Garden City: Doubleday, 1968)
 Lord of Dark Places (New York: Norton, 1970)
 Wait Until the Evening (Garden City: Doubleday, 1974)
 Seventh Heaven (Garden City: Doubleday, 1976)
 Insanity Runs In Our Family: Short Stories (Garden City: Doubleday, 1977)()

as Harriet Janeway
 This Passionate Land (1979)

as John D. Revere
 Justin Perry : The Assassin
 The Assassin 2 : Vatican Kill
 The Assassin 3 : Born To Kill
 The Assassin 4: Death's Running Mate
 The Assassin 5: Stud Service

Autobiography
 The Visible Man (1991)

Further reading
 Walcott, Ronald, "The Writer as Satirist, Part I: The Novels of Hal Bennett". Black World/Negro Digest, June 1974, pp. 36–48, 89–97; "The Writer as Magician/Priest, Part II: The Novels of Hal Bennett", Black World/Negro Digest, pp. 78–96.

References

External links
 Katharine Newman, "An Evening with Hal Bennett: An Interview", Black American Literature Forum, Vol. 21, No. 4 (Winter 1987), pp. 357–378.

African-American novelists
20th-century American novelists
20th-century American male writers
American historical novelists
1936 births
2004 deaths
American male novelists
20th-century African-American writers
21st-century African-American people
African-American male writers